Batman: Dead End is a superhero fan film written and directed by Sandy Collora that premiered on July 19, 2003 at the San Diego Comic-Con, and on the internet shortly thereafter. The film crosses over the DC Comics superhero Batman with the Alien and Predator science fiction film franchises.

Plot
During a stormy night in Gotham City, the Joker escapes from Arkham Asylum while Batman prepares to hunt for him. Batman finds and corners the Joker in an alleyway, but before the Dark Knight can take him back to the asylum, the Joker is quickly dragged off by an Alien and is presumably killed. Another Alien attacks Batman, but is killed by a Predator, which the Dark Knight fights and defeats. Suddenly, more Predators appear just as more Aliens emerge from the darkness behind Batman. The film ends abruptly with a cliffhanger as the Dark Knight is surrounded by the Aliens and the Predators.

Cast
 Clark Bartram as Bruce Wayne/Batman
 Andrew Koenig as the Joker
 Kurt Carley as the Predator
 Jake McKinnon as the Alien
 Dragon Dronet, Patrick Magee and Kurt Carley as other Predators

Production
The film was made for a reported $30,000 and filmed in parts of North Hollywood, California, as a stand-in for Gotham City. Collora filmed a similar project, 2004's World's Finest, with much of the same cast and crew.

Reception
Film director and comic book writer Kevin Smith called it "possibly the truest, best Batman movie ever made", and comic book artist Alex Ross praised it as "Batman the way I've always wanted to see him". Collora has stated in interviews that the film was made as a demonstration reel to attract attention to his directing skills, and as such, succeeded in its goal.

Fan Films Quarterly listed Batman: Dead End as one of the 10 most pivotal moments in fan film history in its Summer 2006 issue.

See also
The Dark Horse comic books which first touched on similar themes are:

Batman/Aliens
Batman Versus Predator

References

External links
 
 Collora Studios - Filmmaker's website
 
 Batman: Dead End at TheForce.net
 Batman: Dead End review at Film Threat
 Batman: Dead End behind the scenes at EW.com

2003 short films
2003 independent films
2000s superhero films
2003 action films
Alien vs. Predator (franchise) films
American superhero films
American action films
Fan films based on Batman
Crossover films
Films shot in Los Angeles
2003 horror films
2003 films
2000s English-language films
2000s American films